Hamza Alić (born 20 January 1979) is a Bosnian shot putter. On 1 March 2013, at 2013 European Athletics Indoor Championships, he won a silver medal which he dedicated to all the people of Bosnia and Herzegovina to coincide with the Bosnia and Herzegovina Independence Day.

Competition record

References

External links
 

1979 births
Living people
Bosnia and Herzegovina male shot putters
Bosniaks of Bosnia and Herzegovina
Athletes (track and field) at the 2008 Summer Olympics
Athletes (track and field) at the 2016 Summer Olympics
Olympic athletes of Bosnia and Herzegovina
People from Srebrenica
World Athletics Championships athletes for Bosnia and Herzegovina
Athletes (track and field) at the 2015 European Games
European Games competitors for Bosnia and Herzegovina
Mediterranean Games silver medalists for Bosnia and Herzegovina
Mediterranean Games bronze medalists for Bosnia and Herzegovina
Athletes (track and field) at the 2005 Mediterranean Games
Athletes (track and field) at the 2009 Mediterranean Games
Athletes (track and field) at the 2013 Mediterranean Games
Athletes (track and field) at the 2018 Mediterranean Games
Mediterranean Games gold medalists for Bosnia and Herzegovina
Mediterranean Games medalists in athletics
Mediterranean Games gold medalists in athletics